The Pentax Q7 is a compact digital mirrorless interchangeable lens camera announced by Pentax on June 12, 2013. While the camera has a larger sensor than its predecessors, the Q and Q10, it is compatible with existing Q series lenses.

References
http://www.dpreview.com/products/pentax/slrs/pentax_q7/specifications

Q7
Cameras introduced in 2013